was a Japanese anime director who directed the Fate/stay night TV series and the Fate/stay night: Unlimited Blade Works film.

Career
Yamaguchi directed several anime series, including Angel Links (1999), I My Me! Strawberry Eggs (2001), Yami to Bōshi to Hon no Tabibito (2003), AM Driver (2004–2005), and Tōka Gettan (2007). He was the director of the 2006 anime adaptation of the Fate/stay night visual novel, and he subsequently directed the 2010 theatrical installment Fate/stay night: Unlimited Blade Works. He later directed The Severing Crime Edge (2013), and Z/X Ignition (2014). He directed episodes of Divergence Eve, GeGeGe no Kitarō, Hajime no Ippo, Outlaw Star, Suite and Smile PreCure!, and 
The King of Braves GaoGaiGar, and its sequel Final.

Yamaguchi died of undisclosed causes sometime before 9 January 2020, when his death was announced by a subsequently-removed tweet by Fate/stay night company Studio Deen. Animators Tomomi Mochizuki and Asako Nishida, who both worked with Yamaguchi, expressed their condolences following Yamaguchi's death.

Works

Director
Angel Links (1999)
I My Me! Strawberry Eggs (2001)
Yami to Bōshi to Hon no Tabibito (2003)
AM Driver (2004–2005)
Fate/stay night (2006)
Tōka Gettan (2007)
Fate/stay night: Unlimited Blade Works (2010)
The Severing Crime Edge (2013)
Z/X Ignition (2014)

Episode director
Divergence Eve
GeGeGe no Kitarō
Hajime no Ippo
Outlaw Star
Smile PreCure!
Suite PreCure
The King of Braves GaoGaiGar
The King of Braves GaoGaiGar Final

Notes

References

Year of birth missing
2020 deaths
20th-century births
Place of death missing
Place of birth missing
Anime directors